Situation is a 2007 studio album by Canadian hip hop musician Buck 65. It is a concept album based around the year 1957. It peaked at number 31 on Billboards Heatseekers Albums chart. At the 2008 Juno Awards, Skratch Bastid was nominated as Producer of the Year for his work on the album.

Critical reception
Situation has received generally favorable reviews from critics. Metacritic gave the album a score of 68/100, based on 21 reviews.

Alex Macpherson of The Guardian gave the album 2 stars out of 5, saying: "There are isolated moments of beauty - the spare piano loop of 'Ho-Boys', though nothing new, is evocative and effective - but little sticks in the mind or stimulates the emotions." Dan Raper of PopMatters gave the album 6 stars out of 10, saying, "Situation is a cool, collected set of songs from the veteran Canadian rapper, but you shouldn't be expecting anything revolutionary—at least, not from the music."

Track listing

Charts

References

External links
 
 

2007 albums
Buck 65 albums
Strange Famous Records albums
Warner Music Group albums
Concept albums